William Alexander Carse (May 29, 1914 – October 31, 2000) was a Canadian professional ice hockey forward who played 122 games in the National Hockey League for the Chicago Black Hawks and New York Rangers. He was born in Edmonton, Alberta. He is the brother of Bob Carse.

External links
 

1914 births
2000 deaths
Canadian ice hockey forwards
Chicago Blackhawks players
Edmonton Eskimos (ice hockey) players
Ice hockey people from Edmonton
New York Rangers players
Canadian expatriate ice hockey players in the United States